The 122nd Guards Rifle Division was an elite infantry division of the Red Army. It was formed in June 1945 from the 2nd formation of the 249th Estonian Rifle Division. The division was stationed in Estonia and disbanded in 1946.

History 
The division was formed on 28 June 1945 from the re-designated 249th Estonian Rifle Division. On the same date the entire 8th Estonian Rifle Corps was raised to Guards status as the 41st Guards Rifle Corps. On its formation the 122nd Guards inherited the honorific title and decorations of the 249th, with its full title being 122nd Guards Rifle Estonian, Order of Lenin, Order of the Red Banner Division. Col. August Yulianovich Feldman was in command of the 249th up to the German surrender and likely continued in command of the 122nd Guards until he was appointed deputy commander of the 41st Guards Corps.

This re-designation took place nearly two months after V-E Day, but before the Soviet invasion of Manchuria, so technically the 122nd Guards can be considered a wartime formation, although it did not see combat in Manchuria. The division was stationed in Tartu and was disbanded there in 1946.

References

Citations

Bibliography
 

G122
Military units and formations established in 1945
Military units and formations disestablished in 1946
Military units and formations awarded the Order of the Red Banner
1945 establishments in the Soviet Union
1946 disestablishments in the Soviet Union